The 1994 European Curling Championships were held from December 4 to 10 at the Gärdeshallen in Sundsvall, Sweden.

Men's

A Tournament

Group A

Group B

B Tournament

Group A

Playoffs

Women's

Group A

Group B

B Tournament

Group A

Playoffs

References

European Curling Championships, 1995
European Curling Championships, 1995
European Curling Championships
1994 in European sport 
Sports competitions in Sundsvall
International curling competitions hosted by Sweden